Randy (subtitled Băp!! Beep Boo-Bee Băp Beep-M-Boo Bee Băp!) is an album by American jazz pianist Randy Weston recorded in 1964 and originally released on Bakton, Weston's own label. The album was later reissued in 1972 on the Atlantic label under the title African Cookbook.

Reception

Allmusic awarded the album 4 stars, stating: "When this set was recorded in 1964, pianist Randy Weston had no luck interesting any label to release the music, so he came out with it independently on his tiny Bakton company... It is surprising that no company in the mid-1960s signed Weston up because "Willie's Tune" from the set had the potential to catch on, "Berkshire Blues" is somewhat known and the mixture of accessible bop with African rhythms overall is appealing... An excellent outing."

Track listing 
All compositions by Randy Weston except as indicated
 "Berkshire Blues" - 4:55     
 "Portrait of Vivian" - 3:43     
 "Willie's Tune" - 4:06     
 "Niger Mambo" (Bobby Benson) - 5:21     
 "African Cookbook" - 12:14     
 "Congolese Children" - 2:07     
 "Blues for Five Reasons" - 3:07

Personnel 
Randy Weston - piano, celeste
Ray Copeland - trumpet, flugelhorn, arranger (tracks 1-6)
Booker Ervin - tenor saxophone (tracks 1-6)
Vishnu Bill Wood - bass
Lennie McBrowne - drums
Big Black - percussion, vocals (tracks 4-6)
Harold Murray - percussion  (tracks 4-6)

References 

Randy Weston albums
1964 albums
1972 albums
Atlantic Records albums